The 1993 7-Up Uncolas season was the fourth season of the franchise in the Philippine Basketball Association (PBA). The team was renamed Pepsi Mega Bottlers beginning the Governor's Cup.

Notable dates
June 18: Seven-Up defeated Sta.Lucia, 101-99, for its first win in the Commissioners Cup after losing to Shell Helix in their first game. Ludovico Valenciano completed an assist by Kenny Redfield with a fraction of a second left. 

November 28: Pepsi Mega forge two playoffs among three teams for the right to face San Miguel Beermen for the Governors Cup finals with a come-from-behind 96-93 triumph over Purefoods. Kenny Redfield put together his 11th triple-double game of 48 points, 16 rebounds and 11 assists.

Occurrences
The Mega Bottlers import Anthony Martin scored 40 points in his debut in the Governor’s Cup, a 107-124 loss by Pepsi to Swift.  
Martin fractured his thumb in practice and coach Derrick Pumaren was left with no choice but to shipped Martin home after just one game and recalled back Kenny Redfield, who was also their import in the Commissioner's Cup.

Roster

Transactions

Trades

Additions

Subtractions
{| cellspacing="0"
| valign="top" |

Recruited imports

References

TNT Tropang Giga seasons
7-Up